The Arizona Agribusiness and Equine Center is a chain of public charter high schools that focus on agricultural businesses. The schools are located on college campuses in collaboration with Maricopa County Community College District and Yavapai Community College. The system was founded in 1997 with the South Mountain campus.

Campuses
Estrella Mountain (West Valley)
Paradise Valley
Prescott Valley
Red Mountain (East Mesa)
South Mountain (South Phoenix)
Mesa Community College (West Mesa)

External links
Official website

Public high schools in Arizona
Charter schools in Arizona